Prince's ward is an administrative division of the London Borough of Lambeth, England. It is located in the North of the borough, bounded by the River Thames on the west and Kennington Park Road on the east. It is made up of much of Kennington and Vauxhall.

Prince's ward is located in the Vauxhall parliamentary constituency and is one of four wards in the borough's north Lambeth division.

Prince's contains two schools: Archbishop Sumner Primary School, and Vauxhall Primary School. Prince's along with its neighbouring Oval ward, is home to the buzzing night-time economy of Vauxhall, including the renowned Grade II listed, LGBT venue Royal Vauxhall Tavern.

Prince's is also the home of Vauxhall Gardens Estate Residents and Tenants Association (VGERTA) that represents 2,500 residents in Vauxhall Gardens Estate which is the biggest Residents and Tenants Association in Lambeth.

Local landmarks
Vauxhall City Farm, located in the Vauxhall Pleasure Gardens.
British Secret Intelligence Service, MI6 Headquarters, on Albert Embankment
Newport Street Gallery, home to Damien Hirst's art collection
The City and Guilds of London Art School, one of the longest-established art colleges in the country, has been at Kennington Park Road since 1879
The Cinema Museum on Dugard Way.

Lambeth Council elections

External links
Lambeth map of Prince's ward
Prince's ward results on Lambeth website
Prince's website promoted by Labour Councillors in Prince's ward

Wards of the London Borough of Lambeth